Paul Weingarten, Ph.D. (20 April 1886, in City of Brünn, Margravial Moravia, Imp.&R. Austria – 11 April 1948, in Vienna, Second Republic of Austria) was a Moravia-born pianist and music teacher.

He studied Music History at the University of Vienna, where he obtained a Ph.D. in 1910.

He studied music at the Vienna Conservatory. Among his teachers were Emil von Sauer (piano),  Robert Fuchs (theory), Guido Adler.

After traveling through Europe as a concert pianist, he became a piano teacher at the Vienna Music Academy. On his return to Austria, in March 1938, from a concert tour in Japan, German troops were advancing in Austria. He left Austria to return in 1945 to give a piano masterclass at the Vienna Academy of Music.

Jazz keyboardist Joe (Josef) Zawinul reports he was taught by Weingarten at the Vienna Conservatory in 1939 before Weingarten "had to leave."

He was married with Anna Maria Josefa Elisabeth von Batthyány-Strattmann (23 March 1909, Kittsee  21 September 1992, Vienna), a daughter of László Batthyány-Strattmann.

References 
 Material from external links below

External links 
 Paul Weingarten
 Biography (in German)
 Paul Weingarten (Geni.com)
 Paul Weingarten, Jr.
 Paul Weingarten

1886 births
1948 deaths
Musicians from Brno
People from the Margraviate of Moravia
Austrian Christians
20th-century Austrian musicians
20th-century Austrian male musicians
20th-century classical pianists
20th-century Austrian educators
Austrian classical pianists
Male classical pianists
Piano pedagogues
Austrian music educators
Czech musicians
University of Vienna alumni
Emigrants from Austria after the Anschluss
Austrian expatriates in Japan
Burials at the Vienna Central Cemetery
20th-century Japanese male musicians